Joshua Eagle and Sandon Stolle were the defending champions but did not compete that year.

Yves Allegro and Roger Federer won in the final 7–6(9–7), 7–5 against Mahesh Bhupathi and Max Mirnyi.

Seeds

  Jonas Björkman /  Todd Woodbridge (first round)
  Mahesh Bhupathi /  Max Mirnyi (final)
  Martin Damm /  Cyril Suk (first round)
  Jared Palmer /  David Rikl (first round)

Draw

External links
 2003 CA-TennisTrophy Doubles draw

Vienna Open
2003 ATP Tour
2003 in Austrian tennis